The Stadio Comunale Stefano Lotti is a football stadium in Poggibonsi, Italy. It is the home of Unione Sportiva Poggibonsi. 
The Stadium has a full capacity of 3600 and it has 2513 seats, all of which are numbered and divided into six areas.

 VIP forum
 Central tribune
 North side forum
 South side forum
 Stairs local
 Stairs guest

The peloton has dimensions of 105 x 62 meters and is surrounded on the lawn, lighting requirements for a set of Pro League athletics.
The stadium is provided with all facilities for government regulations, and is equipped with:

 Emergency Facilities
 Toilets within each sector
 Seating for the handicapped / disabled access
 News Room / Press Center
 Refreshments for local fans and visitors

References

See also
 Unione Sportiva Poggibonsi
 Football in the Municipality of Poggibonsi

Football venues in Italy
Sports venues in Italy